Turkey Creek is a  long 2nd order tributary to Roberson Creek in Chatham County, North Carolina, United States

Course
Turkey Creek rises about 3 miles southwest of Pittsboro, North Carolina in Chatham County and then flows northeast to Roberson Creek joining about 1 mile southeast of Pittsboro.

Watershed

References

Rivers of North Carolina
Rivers of Chatham County, North Carolina